Helena Zoila Tirona Benitez (June 27, 1914 – July 14, 2016) was a Filipina academic and administrator of the Philippine Women's University.

Biography
Benitez was born in Manila to Conrado Benitez, a pensionado to the United States and a member of the 1935 Constitutional Convention, and Francisca Tirona who was an educator and co-founder of Philippine Women's College in 1919. She was highly educated. She graduated from Philippine Women's University and was a student at George Washington University (where she was Chair of the UN Commission on the Status of Women in 1969 and the first woman to serve as President of the UN Environment Program in 1975). She also had post graduate training from the University of Chicago and Iowa State University.

She served in the Senate of the Philippines from 1967 until Congress was closed when martial law was declared in 1972, and at the Batasang Pambansa from 1978 until it was abolished in 1986. Benitez wrote several bills involving the promotion of Filipino national culture, including Republic Act 5871, which established commissions devoted to preserving cultural artifacts. These commissions tried to revive indigenous arts and crafts through training, facilitation workshops, and funding institutions.

Benitez also founded the Bayanihan Dance Company. Benitez was also the executive producer of the Bayanihan. Benitez was proud of the fact that the Bayanihan had highly authentic costumes and instruments from Filipino "tribal" peoples. She emphasized authenticity in the troupe's performance. She founded the troupe to be evidence of Philippine culture to the world. She negotiated a contract with Sol Hurok for the Bayanihan to perform on Broadway in New York City and got an exclusive endorsement from Philippine Presiden Carlos P. Garcia, designating the Bayanihan as the official representation of Filipino traditional dance to the Americas and Europe. This led to the Bayanihan's historic performance on October 13, 1959, at the Winter Garden Theater on Broadway, which paved the way for the Bayanian becoming the most prominent Filipino dance troupe of that time.

Benitez died on July 14, 2016, aged 102.

See also
 List of centenarians (politicians and civil servants)

References 

1914 births
2016 deaths
Senators of the 7th Congress of the Philippines
Members of the House of Representatives of the Philippines from Cavite
Filipino centenarians
Members of the Batasang Pambansa
Philippine Women's University alumni
George Washington University alumni
University of Chicago alumni
Iowa State University alumni
Women members of the Senate of the Philippines
Women members of the House of Representatives of the Philippines
Women centenarians
Senators of the 6th Congress of the Philippines
Academic staff of Philippine Women's University